Kongo Loto Lafanga is an islet of Nukufetau, Tuvalu, which is south of Lafanga islet in the North East of Nukufetau atoll.

References

Islands of Tuvalu
Pacific islands claimed under the Guano Islands Act
Nukufetau